The dark proteome is defined as proteins with no defined three-dimensional structure. It can not be detected or analyzed with the use of homologous modeling or analytical quantification for the molecular conformation is unknown. Dark proteins are mostly composed of unknown unknowns

History and Origin 

It estimated to be about 14% of the proteome in archaea and bacteria, and as much as 44–54% of the proteome in eukaryotes and viruses, is dark. The origin of these dark proteins is unclear. Large portion of the dark proteome are of viral origin. Dark protein regions are dark due to originating from unusual organisms with no sufficient close relatives in current protein databases to provide protein to protein data on sequence alignments and structure determination.

Function 

Dark proteins are not applicable to the structure-function paradigm the all proteins follow. They are predominately consisted of Intrinsically Disordered Proteins (IDP) that are necessary for certain biological function such as splicing, transcriptional and post-translational signaling, and signaling via protein networks. These processes are commonly executed intracellularly, however, dark proteins are over-represented in the extra-cellular matrix and on the endoplasmic reticulum. Dark proteins behave similarly to polymers and are capable of taking on many if not infinite conformations form due to the adaptability of the polypeptide chain. This is due to the lack of structure which provides flexibility and maneuverability which aids in certain ribosomal and cellular processes. They also are overrepresented in certain secretory tissues and exterior environment which aids the cell against harsh cellular environments. The function is not limited to only signaling and defense, though it is not fully understood. "Dark proteins are mostly unknown unknowns"

Methods for detection 

Currently only computational and analytical techniques such infrared (IR), circular dichroism (CR), mass spectrometry (MS), single-molecule experiment, wide-angle X-ray scattering, small-angle X-ray scattering, wide-angle X-ray scattering (WAXS), Nuclear magnetic resonance (NMR), and gel filtration. Coupled methodology with techniques are recommended if there are certain data points missing with the use of one method, the complementary method may serve to fill that gap.

See also 
 Intrinsically disordered proteins
 Protein dynamics

References 

Proteomics